Out of Office is a 2022 American comedy television film. It aired on Comedy Central on September 5, 2022.

Plot
A remote worker (Milana Vayntrub) dealing with the pitfalls of a digital commute.

Cast
 Ken Jeong as Kyle
 Milana Vayntrub as Eliza
 Jay Pharoah as Neal
 Leslie Jones as Ally
 Jason Alexander
 Cheri Oteri as Janet
 Christopher Nicholas Smith as Mark 
 Chris Gethard as Winston
 Emily Pendergast as Margie
 Oscar Nuñez as X Fernandez
 Paul F. Tompkins as Mr. Donahue

Production
Principal photography began on March 22 2022 and concluded on April 15 2022.

Reception

Ratings 
During its premiere on September 5, 2022, in the 8:00 PM time slot, Out of Office attracted a total of 330,000 viewers, with a 0.15 rating for people aged 18–49.  The film performed better than Comedy Central's two previous original films A Clusterfunke Christmas and Hot Mess Holiday, and it was the best performance since Comedy Central restarted to make the original television films in 2020.

References

External links
 Official website
 

2022 films
2022 television films
2022 comedy films
American comedy television films
Comedy Central original programming
2020s English-language films